The 2021 FIBA Europe SuperCup Women was the 10th edition of the FIBA Europe SuperCup Women. It was held on 22 October 2021 at the Font de Sant Lluís in Valencia, Spain.

Final

References

External links
 SuperCup Women

2021
2021–22 in European women's basketball
2021–22 in Spanish basketball
International women's basketball competitions hosted by Spain
Sport in Valencia
October 2021 sports events in Spain